Gmina Mirsk is an urban rural gmina (administrative district) in Lwówek Śląski County, Lower Silesian Voivodeship, in south-western Poland, on the Czech border.

Neighbouring gminas
Gmina Mirsk is bordered by the towns of Świeradów-Zdrój and Szklarska Poręba, and the gminas of Gryfów Śląski, Leśna, Lubomierz and Stara Kamienica. It also borders the Czech Republic.

Villages
Apart from the town of Mirsk, the gmina contains the villages of Brzeziniec, Gajówka, Giebułtów, Gierczyn, Grudza, Kamień, Karłowiec, Kłopotnica, Kotlina, Krobica, Kwieciszowice, Mlądz, Mroczkowice, Orłowice, Proszowa, Przecznica and Rębiszów.

Twin towns – sister cities

Gmina Mirsk is twinned with:
 Dubá, Czech Republic
 Lázně Libverda, Czech Republic
 Nové Město pod Smrkem, Czech Republic

References

Mirsk
Lwówek Śląski County